This Man Is Dangerous (U.S. title: The Patient Vanishes) is a 1941 British thriller film, directed by Lawrence Huntington and starring James Mason and Gordon McLeod.  The film is based on the 1934 novel They Called Him Death by David Hume.

This film was long thought entirely lost, but a dubbed Italian version has been traced. 
Having named the film on their "BFI 75 Most Wanted" list, the British Film Institute subsequently screened a discovered American reel of the film under its American title of 'The Patient Vanishes' in 2017 at its Big Thrill event - the first time the film had been shown on reel in the United Kingdom in seventy years.

Plot
Mick Cardby (Mason) earns a living as a self-employed private detective, to the exasperation of his father, Detective Inspector Cardby of Scotland Yard (McLeod), who would much prefer his son to enrol as a regular policeman.

A policeman is killed while on duty in Hyde Park and Scotland Yard are keen to catch the killer of their colleague.  Mick launches his own enquiries, which lead him to Lord Morne (G. H. Mulcaster) who is frantic with worry as his daughter Lena has been abducted by a gang of blackmailers.  Lord Morne offers Mick £1,000 to recover Lena safely.  Mick gets to work and, aided by his secretary Molly (Margaret Vyner), tracks down the kidnappers to a shady nursing home in a remote rural area. However they manage to flee with Lena to North Wales.

The kidnappers arrange a ransom drop with Lord Morne, but Mick arranges for him to go into hiding and goes to the rendezvous himself in disguise. His deception is uncovered and he is overpowered and taken to a derelict cargo ship. The gang use torture to try to get him to reveal Lord Morne's whereabouts, but Mick keeps his nerve and refuses to divulge the information. Finally they throw him into the ship's hold and set the vessel on fire.  Mick manages to escape in the nick of time, and also rescues a member of the gang who had apparently been deemed surplus to requirements and had also been left to die on the blazing ship. This man is understandably disgruntled by his treatment at the hands of his former partners in crime, and is only to happy to help Mick out with the location where Lena is being held.

Mick makes his way to the hideout and approaches stealthily, but not well enough to avoid being spotted by a lookout. A dramatic confrontation follows, and just as things are starting to look desperate for Mick, his father turns up with a Scotland Yard posse to save the day. The gang is captured and the rescued Lena is reunited with her father. She expresses her gratitude to Mick, with the hope that they will get to know each other better.

Cast

 James Mason as Mick Cardby
 Mary Clare as Matron
 Margaret Vyner as Molly Bennett
 Gordon McLeod as Inspector Cardby
 Frederick Valk as Dr. Moger
 Barbara Everest as Mrs. Cardby
 Barbara James as Lena Morne
 G. H. Mulcaster as Lord Morne
  
 Eric Clavering as Al Meason
 Terry Conlin as Detective Sergeant Trotter
 William Fay as Mr. Eslick
 Brefni O'Rorke as Dr. Crosbie
 Viola Lyel as Nurse
 Anthony Shaw as Sir Wallace Benson
 Michael Rennie as Inspector

Reception and status
Upon original release, This Man Is Dangerous received good critical notices.  Kine Weekly spoke of "exciting plot, fast action, good thrills, popular romantic and comedy asides, vigorous teamwork, hectic climax...", and added: "It gets away to a flying start and never calls a halt in its hectic gyrations...until crime is paid for in full, youth is vindicated and romance triumphs".  The Monthly Film Bulletin, never known for being overly generous with its praise, wrote: "An admirable cast under the very capable direction of Lawrence Huntington keep the suspense at boiling-point until the end."  In the U.S., the Motion Picture Herald described it as "a thrilling melodrama", although the writer wondered about the ability of American audiences to understand the British accents of the cast.

The current status of the film is unclear. Although it is said to have been shown on British television as recently as 1987, the film was never commercially released to the VHS format of the time, and in fact a 1987 transmission may be debatable because the only film of this title which appears to have been shown that year in the digital archives of the Times, Guardian, Daily Express and Daily Mirror is a 1985 American TV movie. The British Film Institute does not hold a print in the National Archive and attempts to track it down have so far been proved fruitless. Before its partial  rediscovery, the film was classed as "missing, believed lost" and is included on the BFI's "75 Most Wanted" list of missing British feature films. However, a dubbed copy has been shown on Italian television (which has even been released on DVD under the title name "Il ricattatore"), and the BFI are optimistic about tracing an English print.

The film was subsequently discovered in its entirety after the discovery of an American reel in which the title card displays the US title of 'The Patient Vanishes'. This was shown at the BFI in 2017.

References

External links 
 BFI 75 Most Wanted entry, with extensive notes
 
 This Man Is Dangerous at the BFI Film & TV Database

1941 films
1940s thriller films
British crime drama films
British thriller films
British black-and-white films
Films based on British novels
Films directed by Lawrence Huntington
1940s rediscovered films
Films set in London
1941 crime drama films
Rediscovered British films
1940s English-language films
1940s British films